The Red Dirt Album is an album by Stoney LaRue. It was released in August 2005. The song "Down in Flames" was co-written by Brandon Jenkins recorded on his 2004 album, Down in Flames. The song "Forever Young" was written by Bob Dylan and recorded on his 1974 album, Planet Waves.

Track listing
"Down in Flames" (Stoney LaRue, Brandon Jenkins) – 3:52
"Closer To You" (LaRue, Scott Evans) – 3:10
"Idabel Blues" (John Cooper, Clark Peaden) – 4:25
"Downtown" (LaRue) – 3:54
"Solid Gone" (LaRue, Ray Wylie Hubbard) – 3:03
"Walk Away" (LaRue, Cody Canada) – 3:37
"Texas Moon" (LaRue, Wehmeyer, Wood, James) – 4:11
"One Chord Song" (LaRue, Bob Childers) – 3:07
"Bluebird Wine" (Rodney Crowell) – 3:59
"Let Me Hold You" (LaRue, Mike McClure) – 3:39
"Forever Young" (Bob Dylan) – 4:32

Personnel
Mike Byars – drums
Cody Canada – baritone guitar
Scott Evans – background vocals
Eric Hansen – drums
Mike McClure – acoustic guitar, electric guitar, background vocals
Steve Palousek – electric guitar, steel guitar, dobro, lap steel guitar
Jeremy Plato – bass guitar
Rodney Pyeatt – baritone guitar
Stoney LaRue – lead vocals, acoustic guitar
Milton Waters – Hammond B-3 organ
Jeremy Watkins – fiddle, background vocals
Kevin Webb – acoustic guitar, bouzouki, electric guitar

Chart performance

Stoney LaRue albums
2005 albums